Dave Smart (born 1966) is a Canadian former basketball coach. He served as the head men's basketball coach at Carleton University in Ottawa, Ontario from 1999 to 2019, where he led the Ravens to thirteen of the team's fifteen overall U Sports national championships in men's basketball. Smart is currently the Director of Basketball Operations at Carleton, and serves as a consultant to the coaching staff at the Ottawa Senators of the National Hockey League. Smart has also served as an assistant coach with the Canadian men's national team on multiple occasions, working with former NBA player Leo Rautins, and Jay Triano.

University playing career
Smart grew up in Kingston and Ottawa, and attended Queen's University. He graduated from Queen's with a degree in Sociology, and played three seasons of varsity basketball for the Queen's Golden Gaels, from 1991-92 to 1993-94. He set the all-time school record for highest points per game career average (26.6). Smart also set the highest single-game Queen's scoring mark (43 points). His career average is one of the highest ever recorded in Canadian university basketball. In the 1992-93 season, Smart became the only Queen's player ever to lead Canada in scoring average, with an average of 29.4 points per game.  He was selected a first team Ontario University Athletics All-Star in all three of his Queen's seasons.

Smart coached extensively at the high school and club levels, before attending university, and again as a university student, including Nepean High School where he coached the team to a city championship and a berth at OFSAA.

Coaching career

Rejected for the vacant Queen's men's basketball head coaching job following the 1994 season, Smart was hired as an assistant coach for men's basketball by Carleton in 1997, under head coach Paul Armstrong, and served for two years in that role. Smart became the head coach at Carleton in 1999, when Armstrong was promoted into management.

Thirteen Canadian University Basketball Championships as Carleton Ravens head coach

Smart led the Carleton Ravens to five consecutive Canadian Interuniversity Sport national championships in men's basketball, from 2003 to 2007 inclusive. These were the first CIS championships won by Carleton in any sport.

The Ravens' five-year championship streak was broken in 2008 when they were upset 82-80 in double overtime in the CIS semifinals by the Acadia University Axemen; the Ravens, seeded first, had been 32-0 in that season against Canadian teams.

Carleton also won the 2009 CIS basketball championship, the school's sixth, hosted at Scotiabank Place in Ottawa, making the Ravens 19-1 in CIS Final Eight play since 2003.

Carleton lost in the 2010 CIS semifinals to eventual champions Saskatchewan Huskies; this tournament was also hosted at Scotiabank Place.

The CIS Men's Basketball Championships returned to Halifax, Nova Scotia in 2011, after three years at Scotiabank Place in Ottawa, and Smart and the Carleton Ravens captured their seventh CIS National Championship in nine years with a victory over Trinity Western University of British Columbia.

Smart and the Carleton Ravens captured their eighth CIS National Championship, defeating the University of Alberta Golden Bears in the 2012 edition of the championship tournament.

The CIS National Men's Basketball Championships returned to ScotiaBank Place in Ottawa in 2013, and Smart's Carleton Ravens won their ninth title, defeating Lakehead University, 92-42. The Ravens set Canadian university basketball records for largest winning margin (50 points) and fewest points allowed (42 points) in a championship final, and broke the tie with the University of Victoria for the most total championships won in Canadian men's university basketball.

In 2014, Carleton defeated cross-town rivals University of Ottawa Gee-Gees 79-67 to win their tenth CIS National Men's Basketball Championship under Smart's tenure.

Carleton defeated the University of Ottawa in a rematch the following year, for the 2015 CIS Final 8 National Men's Basketball Championship, by a score of 93-46, claiming Carleton's eleventh championship in men's basketball.

On July 31, 2015, Dave Smart took a sabbatical from head coaching duties at Carleton University, and his nephew, Rob Smart, was named interim head coach. Led by coach Rob Smart, and after losing four starters from the previous year's championship, Carleton defeated the Calgary Dinos in the 2016 CIS final by a score of 101-79.  This is the Carleton Ravens' 12th CIS championship win overall, and 6th consecutive championship win.

Dave Smart returned from his sabbatical, and resumed his position as head coach of the Carleton Ravens for the 2016-2017 season. Led by Coach Smart, the Ravens captured their seventh consecutive national championship in men's basketball, thirteenth overall, and twelfth for Dave Smart, defeating the Ryerson Rams 78-69. The seventh consecutive championship by the Ravens matches the record at the Canadian university sports level, set by the University of Victoria.

On March 10, 2019, Coach Smart and the Carleton Ravens won the school's fourteenth men's basketball National Championship (and fifteenth basketball National Championship overall), defeating the Calgary Dinos 83-49.

Director of Basketball Operations, Carleton University

On March 19, 2019, Dave Smart stepped down as head coach of the Carleton University Ravens Men's Basketball team, accepting a new position with the university: Director of Basketball Operations. Ravens Women's Basketball head coach Taffe Charles was named Smart's replacement. With Charles as head coach and Smart as Director of Basketball Operations, Carleton won its fifteenth national championship in men's basketball, defeating the Dalhousie University Tigers 74-65, on March 8, 2020. Charles became the first black head coach to win a Canadian national championship in men's basketball, and the first head coach to win Canadian national championships in both women's and men's basketball.

Smart served as a guest speaker for the Ottawa Senators of the National Hockey League at several of their summer rookie camps, before being hired as a coaching consultant for the team, prior to the 2019–20 NHL season. Smart's focus will be on defensive mindsets, and player attitude and personality.

Dave Smart was named the inaugural General Manager of the expansion Ottawa Blackjacks of the CEBL on December 18, 2019. Smart retained his position of Director of Basketball Operations at Carleton University, concurrent with his duties as General Manager of the Ottawa Blackjacks. Smart stepped down as General Manager of the Ottawa Blackjacks on August 18, 2020.

Consultant, Ottawa Senators

Smart was hired by the Ottawa Senators of the National Hockey League to serve as a consultant to the coaching staff during the 2019-20 season. He continues in this role to this day.

Other coaching awards and achievements

In the 2003, 2005, 2009, 2011, 2012, 2013, 2014, 2017 and 2018 seasons, Smart was awarded the Stewart W. Aberdeen Memorial Trophy, as the top men's basketball coach in Canadian university sports. Smart won OUA coach-of-the-year awards thirteen times, for the 2001, 2002, 2003, 2005, 2009, 2010, 2011, 2012, 2013, 2014, 2017, 2018, and 2019 seasons.

Smart won 92 per cent of his games against Canadian opposition between 1999 and 2019. He led the Ravens to a Canadian men's record of 87 consecutive wins in league and playoff games, from 2002-2005.

On 8 April 2012, Smart was named the Under 20 Great Britain Men's Basketball Head Coach.

Smart has also been an assistant coach with the Canadian national men's basketball team, under former NBA player Leo Rautins, and under NBA coach Jay Triano.

Smart was inducted into the Order of Ottawa by Mayor Jim Watson on November 17, 2016.

He was inducted into the Ottawa Sport Hall of Fame in 2021.

References

1966 births
Living people
Canadian men's basketball coaches
Canadian men's basketball players
Queen's University at Kingston alumni
Sportspeople from Kingston, Ontario
Basketball players from Ottawa
U Sports coaches